Tons of Sobs is the debut studio album by the English rock band Free, released in the UK on 14 March 1969. While the album failed to chart in the UK, it reached number 197 in the US. Free are cited as one of the definitive bands of the British blues boom of the late 1960s, even though this is the only album of their canon that can strictly be called blues rock. According to group bassist Andy Fraser, the title effectively summed up the album. It had the band’s first minor hit "I’m A Mover", which was released as a single in December 1968.

Recording
Free were a new band when they recorded Tons of Sobs, and they were young; none of them was yet 20 and the youngest, Andy Fraser, was just 16. They had achieved a following through constant touring, and their debut album consisted mostly of their live set-list.

With the band signed to Chris Blackwell's Island Records, Guy Stevens was hired to produce the album (he later became notable for producing early albums for Mott the Hoople and the Clash's legendary album London Calling [1979]). He took a minimalist attitude to production due to the extremely low budget of about £800, and he created a raw, raucous sound – although the relative inexperience of the band possibly contributed to this. The album is in marked contrast in production terms to the band's later albums. The simple nature of the recording meant that many tracks translated well to a live setting and several songs from this album were still performed even when the band had written and recorded many more for subsequent records.

The majority of the album was recorded over a few days in October 1968.  Originally slated for a November release, the album was delayed until early 1969 due to the late addition of their cover of "The Hunter". This track was a mainstay of their live sets and was recorded at Stevens' insistence at a December 1968 session.

Track listing
Side one
"Over the Green Hills (Pt. 1)" (Paul Rodgers) – 0:49
"Worry" (Rodgers) – 3:26
"Walk in My Shadow" (Andy Fraser, Simon Kirke, Paul Kossoff, Rodgers) – 3:29
"Wild Indian Woman" (Fraser, Rodgers) – 3:39
"Goin' Down Slow" (James Burke Oden) – 8:20

Side two
"I'm a Mover" (Rodgers, Fraser) – 2:56
"The Hunter" (Booker T. Jones, Carl Wells, Donald Dunn, Al Jackson Jr., Steve Cropper) – 4:13
"Moonshine" (Fraser, Kirke, Kossoff, Rodgers) – 5:04
"Sweet Tooth" (Rodgers) – 4:54
"Over the Green Hills (Pt. 2)" (Rodgers) – 1:58

Bonus tracks
Recent CD reissues contain several bonus tracks:
"I'm a Mover" (BBC session) (Rodgers, Fraser) – 3:04
"Waitin' on You" (BBC session) (B.B. King, Ferdinand Washington) – 2:15
"Guy Stevens Blues" (Rodgers, Fraser, Kirke, Kossoff) – 4:39
"Moonshine" (Alternative vocal) (Fraser, Kirke, Kossoff, Rodgers) – 5:09
"Sweet Tooth" (Early take and alternative vocal) (Rodgers) – 4:53
"Visions of Hell" (Fraser, Rodgers) – 3:46
"Woman by the Sea" (Fraser, Rodgers) – 3:30
"Over the Green Hills" (BBC session) (Rodgers) – 3:51

Personnel
 Paul Rodgers – vocals
 Paul Kossoff – guitar
 Andy Fraser – bass guitar
 Simon Kirke – drums

Additional personnel
 Jimmy Miller – piano (thumping) 
 Guy Stevens – producer
 Andy Johns – engineer
 Mike Sida – front cover photograph
 Richard Bennett Zeff – inside cover photography

References

Bibliography
 Strong, Martin C. The Great Rock Discography, 6th edition. Edinburgh: Canongate Books 1994, 2002. pp. 392–3.
 Sutcliffe, Phil. Notes to Tons of Sobs by Free. Universal Island Records Ltd. 1968, 2001.

External links

Free (band) albums
1969 debut albums
Albums produced by Guy Stevens
Island Records albums